Keith Douglas Rowland Mans,  (born 10 February 1946), British Conservative Party politician.

Mans was Member of Parliament (MP) for Wyre from the 1987 general election until the seat was abolished by boundary changes for the 1997 general election. He stood in the new Lancaster and Wyre seat, but lost to Labour's Hilton Dawson.

Early life and career
Mans was born the son of Major-General Rowland Spencer Noel Mans, CBE and Veeo Mans. He was educated at Berkhamsted School, the RAF College Cranwell and the Open University. He spent twelve years in the RAF, flying Vulcans and Canberras and 28 years flying with the RAF Reserve. Mans was a pilot in the RAF from 1964 to 1977 (Flight Lieutenant) and in the RAF Reserve from 1977 to 2005.

Before entering Parliament, Mans worked for the John Lewis Partnership, where he was a Retail Manager from 1978 to 1987.

In Parliament
Mans was elected to Parliament in 1987. Whilst there, he founded and was the first Chairman of both the Parliamentary Environment Group and the Parliamentary Aerospace Group. He was also a member of the Environment Select Committee and the Defence Select Committee. Mans was Parliamentary Private Secretary to the Secretary of State for Health from 1991 to 1995, and Chairman of the Conservative Defence Committee in 1996.

After Parliament
In 1998, following his election defeat, he took up an appointment as Chief Executive of the Royal Aeronautical Society, a post he held until 2009. While at the Royal Aeronautical Society, he was also Vice-Chairman of the Air League and Chairman of the Air Travel "Greener by Design" Initiative. Mans is now the Chairman of the Council of the Air League.

He has been the County Councillor for Lyndhurst on Hampshire County Council since 2009. From 2013 to 2019, he was the Deputy Leader of the Council, becoming Leader in 2019.

Personal life
In 1972, Mans married Rosalie Mary McCann. They have a son and two daughters. In Who's Who, he lists his recreations as "flying". Mans is a member of the Royal Air Force Club.

References
The Times Guide to the House of Commons, Times Newspapers Ltd, 1997

Notes

1946 births
Living people
Conservative Party (UK) MPs for English constituencies
People educated at Berkhamsted School
UK MPs 1987–1992
UK MPs 1992–1997
Graduates of the Royal Air Force College Cranwell
Royal Air Force officers